Phuket is an island province off the south-west coast of Thailand. 

Phuket may also refer to:
Phuket (city), the capital of the province, in the southeast of the island
Amphoe Mueang Phuket, the district covering the south of the island around the capital
Phuket (film), a 2009 Thai short film